Noah James Allen (born April 28, 2004) is an American soccer player who plays as a defender for Major League Soccer side Inter Miami CF.

Club career
Born in Pembroke Pines, Florida, Allen began his career with Weston FC before joining the academy of Inter Miami in 2019. He made his debut for Inter Miami's reserve side, Inter Miami CF II, on October 3, 2020, against North Texas SC. Allen started and played 67 minutes as Fort Lauderdale were defeated 0–3.

Allen made his Inter Miami CF debut on February 26, 2022, against Chicago Fire FC. On March 11, 2022, Allen signed a homegrown player contract with Inter Miami CF.

International career
In January 2022, Allen was named to a training camp roster for the United States national under-20 team.

Personal life
Born in the United States, Allen is of Greek descent and is a Greek passport holder as of 2022.

Career statistics

Club

Honors
United States U20
CONCACAF U-20 Championship: 2022

References

2004 births
Living people
American soccer players
American people of Greek descent
Inter Miami CF players
Inter Miami CF II players
Association football fullbacks
Homegrown Players (MLS)
Major League Soccer players
MLS Next Pro players
Soccer players from Florida
Sportspeople from Pembroke Pines, Florida
USL League One players
United States men's under-20 international soccer players